Bernard Kimmel (November 18, 1926 – November 2, 2022) was an American physician and politician in the state of Florida.

Kimmel was born in Highland Park, Michigan. He attended Ohio Wesleyan University and the University of Michigan, earning a M.D. degree from the latter in 1956. He also served in the United States Navy during World War II in the Pacific Theater. He served in the Florida House of Representatives from 1980 to 1982 for district 82, and from 1984 to 1986, for district 84. He was a member of the Republican party. He died on November 2, 2022, at the age of 95.

References

1926 births
2022 deaths
Republican Party members of the Florida House of Representatives
University of Michigan Medical School alumni
Physicians from Florida
Ohio Wesleyan University alumni
People from West Palm Beach, Florida
People from Highland Park, Michigan
Military personnel from Michigan
United States Navy personnel of World War II